John Gillespie Henderson (17 January 1932 – 26 January 2005) was a Scottish international footballer who played as a forward in the English Football League for Portsmouth, Wolverhampton Wanderers, Arsenal and Fulham.

Club career
Henderson was born in Glasgow in 1932, and started playing football as a youth with his Bishopbriggs-based church team and for Kirkintilloch Boys Club. He signed for Portsmouth as a 17-year-old, and after completing his National Service in the Royal Army Ordnance Corps he made his debut for the first team against Sunderland in September 1951. At first playing as a centre forward, he also subsequently appeared at inside forward and on the left wing for the club. Henderson's performance with Portsmouth soon attracted the attention of the Scotland international management. A physical player known for his pace, fast crosses and good two feet, he was a regular goalscorer for his seven years with Portsmouth.

Henderson moved on in March 1958 to Wolverhampton Wanderers for £16,000. Wolves won the First Division title that season but Henderson did not qualify for a medal. He began the following season still at Molineux and appeared in a handful of early games in what would be another championship-winning campaign, but played only nine matches in all for Wolves.

Unable to secure a first-team place, Henderson moved on to Arsenal in October 1958 for £20,000, and made his debut against West Bromwich Albion at Highbury on 4 October; he scored twice in a thrilling 4–3 win. Injury interrupted his first season, but he still scored twelve times as Arsenal finished third in the league. He became a regular in the first team in the following two seasons.

Swindin's tinkering with the Arsenal attacking line-up meant the versatile Henderson was unable to hold down any particular position in the side, and midway through the 1961–62 season he was transferred to Fulham for £14,000. He had played 111 games for Arsenal in total, scoring 29 goals.

In his first season at Craven Cottage, Henderson helped Fulham reach the 1961–62 FA Cup semi-final, in which they lost narrowly to Burnley. Henderson also helped keep the Cottagers in the First Division for two seasons. He was a Fulham regular up until March 1963, when he broke his leg. An attempted comeback was unsuccessful, and he left the club in 1964. He continued to play non-league football with Poole Town, where he was top scorer as they were promoted to the Southern League Premier Division, and Dorchester Town until his retirement from football in 1971.

International career
Henderson made his representative debut in a B international against England B in March 1953. His first appearance for the senior team came on 6 May, in a friendly at home to Sweden; Scotland lost 2–1. Henderson's only goal for Scotland came on 3 October, in a 3–1 win over Northern Ireland in a 1953–54 British Home Championship that doubled as a qualifying group for the 1954 World Cup. Scotland finished runners-up and qualified. Henderson was included in their 22-man squad, but only 13 of the 22 travelled to the finals. Henderson stayed at home on reserve with the likes of Bobby Combe and Jimmy Binning. Inside forward George Hamilton was also on reserve but travelled after Bobby Johnstone withdrew through injury. His seventh and final senior cap was also against Northern Ireland, in a 2–2 draw on 5 November 1958.

Personal life
Henderson was married with two sons. After his playing days ended, he left the game and settled in Dorset where he worked as a storeman for a builders' merchant. He died in Poole in 2005 at the age of 73.

Career statistics

International appearances

International goals

Honours
Scotland
 British Home Championship runners-up: 1953–54

Poole Town
 Southern League Division One promotion: 1964–65

Notes

References

1932 births
2005 deaths
Military personnel from Glasgow
Footballers from Glasgow
Scottish footballers
Scotland B international footballers
Scotland international footballers
Association football forwards
Portsmouth F.C. players
Wolverhampton Wanderers F.C. players
Arsenal F.C. players
Fulham F.C. players
Poole Town F.C. players
Dorchester Town F.C. players
English Football League players
Southern Football League players
Western Football League players
1954 FIFA World Cup players
Royal Army Ordnance Corps soldiers
20th-century British Army personnel